Oberea cariniscapus is a species of longhorn beetle in the tribe Saperdini in the genus Oberea, discovered in 1956 by Breuning.

References

C
Beetles described in 1956